Ed Calle (born Eduardo J. Calle) is a musician from Miami, Florida. He was born in Caracas, Venezuela.

Calle plays the saxophones, flutes, clarinets, EWI, and keyboards, engineers projects, and performs vocals. He also composes and arranges music. Calle has served as Chairperson of Arts & Philosophy at Miami Dade College North Campus and is currently Tenured Full Professor of Music Business and Production at Miami Dade College.

During his career he was three times nominated for Latin Grammy Award. First in 2005 for Ed Calle Plays Santana, in 2007 for In the Zone, and in 2014 for "Palo! Live". Calle was nominated for a Grammy Award in 2015 for "Palo! Live".

Calle He has participated in multiple recording projects, which stand out:

Tita Vivar - Tiempos De Regocijo
Héctor Alejandro Cid Pérez - El Glorioso Evangelio (in the song "Gracias Señor")

Political Activity 
In January 2017, Calle posted on Twitter calling to impeach President Barack Obama and referring to him as "The Kenyan."  Aligning himself with the Birther Movement, Calle later said in a statement titled "Response to Twitter Mob" he later issued on his personal site, "that America impeach someone whose posted birth certificate has been carefully analyzed and determined a forgery by at least two independent experts...”

Solo discography
 Dr. Ed Calle Presents Mamblue, 2015 - Mojito Records
 In the Zone, 2006 - Mojito Records
 Ed Calle Plays Santana, 2004 - Pimienta Records
 Twilight, 2001 - Concord Records
 Sunset Harbor, 1999 - Concord Records
 Double Talk, 1995 - Columbia Records

References

http://www.edcalle.com/

External links
The official site
The Teaching Site
http://www.saxshed.com/calle.shtml
https://web.archive.org/web/20071130045948/http://www.grammy.com/latin/8_latin/#08
https://www.facebook.com/edcalle

Year of birth missing (living people)
Living people
People from Caracas
American male saxophonists
American people of Venezuelan descent
Latin Grammy Award winners
21st-century American saxophonists
21st-century American male musicians